Ganapathi S. Poduval  is an Indian actor who entered the Malayalam film industry as a child actor. He is well known for his roles in the movies Vinodayathra and Pranchiyettan & The Saint. He also played a major role in the movie   Chithrasalabhangalude Veedu.

Film career

Ganapathi started his film career by doing dubbing for Santhosh Sivan’s movie Anandabadram. Later, Santosh Sivan introduced him as a child actor through the Bilingual film Before The Rains. He got a breakthrough in his acting career after appearing in the film Vinodayathra, written and directed by Sathyan Anthikkad.

He also got the starring role in the children's film Chithrashalabhangalude Veedu, directed by Krishnakumar and branched out into Hindi with The Waiting Room, directed by Maneej Premnath.

He essayed roles as child artist in various movies like Pranchiyettan & The Saint, Mallu Singh and Alibhai.  After doing various character roles in movies like Kamattipaadam, Puthan Panam and Chunkzz, he went on to do the lead role in the Malayalam movie titled Vallikudilile Vellakkaran.

He was later seen in Mr. & Ms. Rowdy, directed by Jeethu Joseph. in COVID pandemic situation he directed a shortfilm titled  "Onnu Chirikku" He acted in Mridul Nair’s Malayalam web series titled Instagraamam along with Deepak Parambol. He also starred and co-wrote Jan.E.Man (2021) directed and written by his elder brother Chidambaram.

Filmography

All films are in Malayalam language unless otherwise noted.

Awards

References

External links 

 
 

Living people
1990 births
21st-century Indian male actors
Indian male child actors
Indian male film actors
Male actors from Kerala
Male actors in Malayalam cinema